Vattoli Bazaar is a small town situated 2 km east of Balusseri in the Koyilandy -Thamarassery state highway. The location is in Kozhikode district of Kerala state in INdia.

Kinalur Estate
Vattoli Bazaar is a junction and is the starting point of the roads to Nanminda and Kinalur Estate.  Kinalur Estate also previously known as Cochin Malabar Estates is a proposed Special Economic Zone [CEZ] of Kerala State Industrial Development Corporation.

Sports
Usha School Of  Athletics, the sports academy of the former Indian Indian sprinter functions here. (4 km from Vattoli bazaar junction).

Facilities
A Service co-operative bank functions here for the financial needs of the villagers.
There is a post office, Krishi Bhavan and a veterinary hospital here.
Ellath Mookambika Temple and Chindramangalam Sri Krishna Temple are the famous temples of the region.

Festivals
The navarathri festival at the mookambika temple and the aaratte at the sri krishna temple are very famous.

Transportation
Vattoli Bazaar connects to other parts of India through Koyilandy town.  The nearest airports are at Kannur and Kozhikode.  The nearest railway station is at Koyiandy.  The national highway no.66 passes through Koyilandy and the northern stretch connects to Mangalore, Goa and Mumbai.  The southern stretch connects to Cochin and Trivandrum.  The eastern National Highway No.54 going through Kuttiady connects to Mananthavady, Mysore and Bangalore.

References

Koyilandy area
Villages in Kozhikode district